Rudolf Berthold (24 March 1891 – 15 March 1920) was a German flying ace of World War I. Between 1916 and 1918, he shot down 44 enemy planes—16 of them while flying one-handed. Berthold's perseverance, bravery, and willingness to return to combat while still wounded made him one of the most famous German pilots of World War I. This article lists his aerial victories during the conflict.

Aerial victories credited to Rudolf Berthold 

Unconfirmed victories are denoted by "u/c". Confirmed victories are numbered and listed chronologically. Listings of single casualties are obviously of pilots. In victories over an air crew, pilot casualties are listed first, then the observer(s).

Accuracy of combat claims is always of concern when compiling victory lists. As the primary arena for aerial combat on the Western Front was over the German trenches and rear works, German aerial and ground observers could usually verify German victories in considerable detail.

Doubled horizontal lines in table denote changes in unit assignments.

Sources: Basic information compiled from victory lists in Franks et al. 1993, pp. 71–72 and Kilduff 2012, pp. 138–140. Added references for air crew members' names in Notes column are from the narrative text of Kilduff. Citations for individual victories are also given above.  List is complete.

Endnotes

References
 Franks, Norman; Frank W. Bailey; Russell Guest. Above the Lines: The Aces and Fighter Units of the German Air Service, Naval Air Service and Flanders Marine Corps, 1914–1918. Grub Street, 1993. , .
 Kilduff, Peter. Iron Man: Rudolf Berthold: Germany's Indomitable Fighter Ace of World War I. Grub Street, 2012. , .

Aerial victories of Berthold, Rudolf
Berthold, Rudolf